The Fall City Masonic Hall is a historic meeting hall located in Fall City, Washington. It was added to the National Register of Historic Places in 2004 under its original name of Falls City Masonic Hall. 

The hall was built in 1895 and dedicated on July 3, 1896.  It served as a meeting hall for the Falls City Masonic Lodge #66 and associated Masonic bodies. The Lodge room on the second floor can hold 160 people, and the dining room on the first floor has an even larger capacity. It also has a full width front porch.

References

External links

Masonic buildings completed in 1895
Masonic buildings in Washington (state)
National Register of Historic Places in King County, Washington
Buildings and structures in King County, Washington
Clubhouses on the National Register of Historic Places in Washington (state)
1895 establishments in Washington (state)